The Australian Army has operated numerous ships and watercraft.

Vessel classifications
AB - Army Barges & Landing Craft
AH - Army Sea Ambulances
AK - Army Ketches and Schooners
AL - Army Luggers
AM - Army Motor Launches
AS - Army Ships & Army Trawlers
AT - Army Tugs
AV - Army Vessels

Currently active ships/vessels

AM 1353 Coral Snake
14 x LCM-8 landing craft
12 x LARC-V amphibious cargo vehicle

Former vessels



A
AM4 Australian Sun
AM18 Air Wave Destroyed by fire 28 March 1944
AS23 Amiriya
AM38 Amity
AM47 Aphlow
AM51 Anna B
AT71 Acme
AT80 Active
AM88 Avalon
AK82 Alma Doepel
AK94 Abel Tasman
AK96 Arga
AT99 Alexandra
AK121 Ardetta
AD155 Alan
AD155 Alf returned to owner
AL215 Aroha Lost at sea 3 May 1943
AL222 Alidine
AL224 Alcia transferred to RAAF June 1943
AL231 Arawa transferred to RAAF June 1943
AL233 Athalia
AL236 Adiana
AL244 Amy
AL270 Agatha
AM485 Ann
AM492 Ad
AM496 Ainavia
AM543 Aspro
AM546 Aero
AK553 Aramia
AM557 Annabelle
AM568 Ailsa
AM1475 Alatna
AV1356 Ashburton

B
AL 229 Beatrice
AV 1354 Brudenell White
AT 167 Bucra

C
AV 1356 Clive Steele
AV 2767 Crusader
AS 16 Curzon. On March 17, 1943, at Tufi jetty, in Papua while unloading supplies just astern of PT67 and PT119 (of the US Navy), caught fire and was destroyed. PT 67 and PT 119 were also destroyed.

D
AV 2082 Dora

E
AS 28 Elive Star
AV 2075 Emily
AV 2058 Ermine

F
AB 442 Francis Peat
AT 2382 Freda

G
AV 1355 Gascoyne
AB 20 George Peat
AV 1358 Greenough
AV 279 Gundiah

H
AV 1353 Harry Chauvel

J
AT 2700 Joe Mann
AS 3051 John Monash

K
AB 97 Kalang

L
AS 129 Lady Ruth
AV 1369 Lagunta
AS3050 "Lerida" 66 feet Wooden Cargo Vessel (Trawler Design)

M
AS 1742 Macalva
AM 50 Malmar
AT 2383 Mollymawk
MSL 252
AV 1354 Murchison

N
AS 6 Nurls

R
AM 417 Ross Gillett

T
AT 2701 The Luke
AL 228 Timena

V
AV 1355 Vernon Sturdee

W
AS 21 Wavell
AM 41 Windsong I

Y
AB 2 Yashima Maru

Further reading
 Askey, M. W., 1998. 'By the mark five' : a definitive history of the participation of Australian Water Transport Units in World War II. Turramurra, N.S.W.: Murray David. 
 Ross Gillett, 1983. Australian & New Zealand warships, 1914-1945. Sydney: Doubleday Australia. 
 Australian Water Transport Association, 1990. Soldiers at sea : an unofficial history of the Australian Water Transport Units of the Royal Australian Engineers, 2nd A.I.F. Strathfield, N.S.W. : Australian Water Transport Association. 
 Australian Water Transport Association, 1992. Soldiers at sea, Mk II : an unofficial history of the maritime units of the Australian Army. Strathfield, N.S.W. : Australian Water Transport Association.

References

Army
Australian Army
Ships of Australia